National Rally (RN) was a political party in Belgium led by Jean Evrard.

History
In the 1961 general elections the party received 0.8% of the vote and won a single seat in the Chamber of Representatives. It did not contest any further elections.

References

Defunct political parties in Belgium